Lock Me Up is the fourth EP by American rock band The Cab, released April 29, 2014 through Republic Records in the United States. The EP marks the band's first release since their second full-length studio album Symphony Soldier, released on August 23, 2011. In 2012, the band announced that they were in the studio writing and recording a new album and signed to Republic Records. The week prior to the EP's release, on April 24, Alex Marshall announced his departure from the band. In early April, the band teased a new single titled "Lock Me Up" on their official Instagram account, which was released on April 28, 2014. It debuted on the Billboard 200 at number 44, and on Digital Albums at number 11.

Sound and influence

The band began the progress of recording the EP in late 2012. Upon the EP's release, on April 29 the album was described to have a "poppier/R&B influenced sound" and overall was a "collection of love songs" by Alter the Press. The EP strives away from the band's previous studio album Symphony Soldiers pop punk and alternative rock sound and drives closer to a more recognizable radio friendly, dance-pop and R&B sound. The EP's second track "Moon" is an electropop influenced track fit for top forty radio. The opening self-titled track, "Lock Me Up" reverts to the band's themes on Symphony Soldier, having a similar "thumping marching army" vibe. It was produced by Steve Mac and co-written by English singer and songwriter John Newman. The EP's third and fourth tracks; "Numbers" and "Stand Up" contain an R&B and urban sound. The final track, "These Are The Lies" experiments with more electronica and dubstep sounds with a piano-driven and violin-influenced opening.

Personnel

 Alexander DeLeon - lead vocals
 Alex T. Marshall - rhythm guitar, piano, backing vocals
 Chantry Johnson - lead guitar, backing vocals
 Dave Briggs - drums, percussion
 Joey Thunder- bass guitar

Track listing
All track names and duration information were taken from Spotify.

Charts

References

2014 EPs
The Cab albums